Gary Martin (1958 – November 10, 2022) was an American politics reporter. He was a Washington bureau chief who covered the United States Congress for the Las Vegas Review-Journal.

Martin was a native of Boulder, Colorado. He attended Colorado State University. He had a decades-long career reporting on government and working as a Washington correspondent, starting at the San Antonio Express-News. 

Martin won a Sigma Delta Chi Award from the Society of Professional Journalists for leading the reporting team at the Express-News that broke the story about Supreme Court Justice Antonin Scalia's death.

Martin was found dead in a hotel room in Las Vegas after reporting on the 2022 United States elections two months after the murder of his colleague Jeff German.

References

1958 births
2022 deaths
20th-century American journalists
21st-century American journalists
American male journalists
American newspaper reporters and correspondents
People from Boulder, Colorado